Shadia Rifa'i Habbal (Arabic: شادية رفاعي حبال) is a Syrian-American astronomer and physicist specialized in Space physics. A professor of Solar physics, her research is centered on Solar wind and Solar eclipse.

Life and education
She was born as Shadia Na'im Rifa'i in the city of Homs where she finished secondary education, she enrolled in the University of Damascus where she received her bachelor in physics and math. She received a master in physics from the American University of Beirut before receiving her PhD from the University of Cincinnati.

Career
She completed a one-year ASP term at the National Center for Atmospheric Research (1977-1978) and joined the Center for Astrophysics  Harvard & Smithsonian in 1978 where she established a research group in solar-terrestrial physics, a position she kept until 2000. Habbal was also appointed as a professor of solar terrestrial physics at the Institute of Mathematical and Physical Sciences at the University of Wales, Aberystwyth. Between (1995-2000) she was a lecturer at Harvard University.

In 2002 she was appointed editor in the Journal of Geophysical Research, Space Physics Section. Prof Habbal is a member of many professional bodies including the American Astronomical Society, the International Astronomical Union, the Hawaii Institute for Astronomy as well as being a fellow of the Royal Astronomical Society.

Research
 
Prof. Habbal focus on the origin and evolution of the solar wind, solar magnetic fields and eclipse polarimetric observations. She led 10 solar eclipse expeditions, visiting places such as India (1995), Guadeloupe (1998), China (2008) and French Polynesia (2010). Habbal led a team of the Hawaii Institute for Astronomy that took part in the observation of solar corona during eclipse in association with NASA in 2006, 2008 and 2009, she also played a key role in establishing the NASA Parker Solar Probe, which launched in 2018 and was the first spacecraft to fly into the solar corona.

Honors

Pioneer, Arab Thought Foundation, December 2004.
Certificate of Guest Professor from the University of Science and Technology of China, Hefei, September 4, 2001.
NASA Group Achievement Award, Spartan 201 white Light Coronagraph Team, Washington DC, August 14, 2000.
Adventurous Women Lecture Series Award, Harvard-Smithsonian Center for Astrophysics Women's Program Committee, June 8, 1998.
Certificate of Appreciation for outstanding service and support - Harvard-Smithsonian Center for Astrophysics, December 19, 1997.
Certificate of Appreciation for outstanding service -National Research Council, Board on Atmospheric Sciences and Climate, 1996.
Certificate of Award in recognition of special achievement reflecting a high standard of accomplishment, Smithsonian Institution, July 25, 1993.

Selected publications

References

External links
 Shadia Habbal - Google Scholar

Year of birth missing (living people)
Living people
Syrian astronomers
Syrian physicists
Syrian women scientists
Women astronomers
Syrian emigrants to the United States
NASA people
People from Homs
Damascus University alumni
American University of Beirut alumni
University of Cincinnati alumni
Category:Syrian scientists